Caelostomus anceps is a species of ground beetle in the subfamily Pterostichinae. It was described by Tschitscherine in 1903.

References

Caelostomus
Beetles described in 1903